The 1991–92 Irish Cup was the 112th edition of Northern Ireland's premier football knock-out cup competition. It concluded on 2 May 1992 with the final.

Portadown were the defending champions after winning their 1st Irish Cup last season, defeating Glenavon 2–1 in the 1991 final. This season Glenavon went one better by winning their 4th Irish cup, defeating Linfield 2–1 in the final.

Results

First round
The following teams were given byes into the second round: 1st Liverpool, Annagh United, Bangor Amateurs, Bridge End United, Cromac Albion, Dervock United, Donard Hospital, Downshire Young Men, Drumaness Mills, Dungiven Celtic, East Belfast, Hanover, Harland & Wolff Sport, Islandmagee, Killyleagh Youth, Larne Tech Old Boys, Mosside United, Nitos Athletic, Northern Telecom, Oxford United Stars, Portglenone, RUC, Saintfield United, Shorts, Southend United, Star of the Sea, UUC and UUJ.

|}

Replay

|}

Second round

|}

Replays

|}

Third round

|}

Replay

|}

Fourth round

|}

Replays

|}

Fifth round

|}

Replays

|}

Sixth round

|}

Replays

|}

Quarter-finals

|}

Semi-finals

|}

Final

References

1991–92
1991–92 domestic association football cups
Cup